Kibuku District is a district in Eastern Uganda. It is named after its 'chief town', Kibuku, where the district headquarters are located.

Location
Kibuku District is bordered by Pallisa District to the north, Budaka District to the east, Butaleja District to the south, and Namutumba District to the west. The coordinates of the district are:01 02N, 33 50E.

Overview
Kibuku District was created by Act of the Ugandan Parliament, on 1 July 2010. Prior to that the district was part of Pallisa District.

Population
The national census in 1991 estimated the district population at about 91,200. The next census in 2002 estimated the population of the district at about 128,200. In 2012, the population of Kibuku District was estimated at approximately 181,700.

Economic activity
Agriculture (subsistence and commercial), is the mainstay of the district economy. crop agriculture involves the following crops:

Religious Persecution
On 23 September 2015, 59 year old evangelist Samson Nfunyeku was murdered by Islamists in the village of Kalampete, Kibulu District. Nfunyeku's attackers were opposed to his attempts to convert Muslims to Christianity. One month later, Nfunyeku's sister, Mamwikomba Mwanika, a mother of eight, was also killed.

Then, in August 2021, a Muslim father of a 20-year-old convert to Christianity killed him in Bupalama village for refusing to recant his Christian faith.

See also
 Kibuku
 Eastern Region, Uganda
 Pallisa District
 Districts of Uganda

References

External links
  Kibuku District Information Portal
 Jennifer Namuyangu Comes From Kibuku District

 
Districts of Uganda
Eastern Region, Uganda